Mohammad Aslam (born 15 January 1975) is a Pakistani former cricketer. He played 14 first-class and 13 List A matches for several domestic teams in Pakistan between 1993 and 1996.

See also
 List of Pakistan Automobiles Corporation cricketers

References

External links
 

1975 births
Living people
Pakistani cricketers
Pakistan Automobiles Corporation cricketers
Railways cricketers
Rawalpindi cricketers
Cricketers from Lahore